A canon penitentiary is a member of the chapter at cathedral or collegiate churches, who acts as a general confessor of the diocese. He has ordinary jurisdiction in the internal forum, which power, however, he may not delegate to others, and may absolve residents and strangers in the diocese and subjects of the diocese also outside same. His power extends also to sins and censures reserved to the bishop. The office of general confessor is foreshadowed in the early history of penitential discipline. Distinct legislation concerning the office is found in the Fourth Lateran Council (1215), but especially in the Council of Trent (1545–1563).

References
 

Catholic ecclesiastical titles
Priests
Confession (Catholic Church)
Sacramental law